Xiangxue may refer to:
 , a place (tourist spot) in Luogang, Guangzhou City
 , a station of Guangzhou Metro
 Xiangxue Pharmaceutical a company that named after the place
 Guangzhou Evergrande Taobao F.C., a Chinese football club that was sponsored by Xiangxue Pharmaceutical as "Guangzhou Xiangxue"
 Xiangxue Pharmaceutical (football), a sponsored name for several Chinese youth team that played in Hong Kong
 Shenzhen F.C., a Chinese football club that was sponsored by Xiangxue Pharmaceutical and known as Shenzhen Xiangxue Eisiti (Shenzhen Xiangxue Shangqingyin)
 Xiangxue Eisiti (Hong Kong), B team of Shenzhen F.C. that played in Hong Kong
 Sun Hei SC, a Hong Kong football club that was sponsored by Xiangxue Pharmaceutical as Xiangxue Sun Hei